Saladillo Partido is a partido of Buenos Aires Province in Argentina.

Settlements

Álvarez de Toledo
Del Carril
Cazón
Polvaredas
Saladillo, cabecera (capital city)
El Mangrullo
La Barrancosa
La Campana
La Mascota
La Razón
La Margarita
Juan José Blaquier
Esther
Emiliano Reynoso
Saladillo Norte
José R. Sojo
San Blas
Gobernador Ortíz de Rosas
San Benito

External links

Saladillo Digital (Spanish)

Partidos of Buenos Aires Province
States and territories established in 1839